Legere or Légère are surnames. Notable people with the surnames include:

 Allan Legere (born 1948), Canadian criminal
 Felton Legere (1913–1963), Canadian politician
 Jacqueline Legere (born 1991), Canadian ice skater
 John Legere (born 1958), American businessman 
 Leroy Legere, Canadian politician
 Marlon Legere (born 1975), American criminal
 Mary A. Legere, American military officer
 Michel Légère (born 1943), civil servant and politician
 Phoebe Legere, multi-disciplinary artist
 Ray Legere, Canadian bluegrass fiddler
 Ricky Legere (born 1985), American professional mixed martial artist